This article is about music-related events in 1833.

Events
February 24 – The Grand Theatre, Warsaw, Poland, is inaugurated with a production of Rossini's The Barber of Seville.
May 13 – Felix Mendelssohn's Italian Symphony in A major, Op. 90, is premièred under the composer's baton in London; although very successful there he withdraws it for revision.
July 8 – Lyrics by Francisco Acuña de Figueroa are selected as the National Anthem of Uruguay.
October 3 – French composer Hector Berlioz marries Anglo-Irish actress Harriet Smithson in a civil ceremony at the British Embassy in Paris with Liszt as one of the witnesses.
December 1 – Launch of Le Ménestrel, a French weekly music journal; it survives until 1940.
Late – First publication of the Toccata and Fugue in D minor, BWV 565 for organ attributed to Johann Sebastian Bach as part of a collection of Bach's organ works produced by Breitkopf & Härtel in Leipzig and partly prepared by Mendelssohn.
Carl Friedrich Rungenhagen, director of the Sing-Akademie zu Berlin, conducts the first performance of Johann Sebastian Bach's St John Passion after the composer's death in 1750.

Popular music
"God Rest You Merry, Gentlemen"
"Još Hrvatska ni propala" m. Ferdo Livadić w. Ljudevit Gaj (written in 1832)

Classical music
Charles Valentin Alkan – Rondo Brilliant for String Quartet
William Sterndale Bennett – Piano Concerto No. 3 in C minor
Hector Berlioz – Overture 'King Lear', H 53, premiered December 22 in Paris
Frédéric Chopin
Grande valse brillante in E-flat major, Op. 18
Boléro, Op. 19
Carl Czerny 
Divertissement de concert, Op.204
Introduction, variations et presto finale sur 'Norma', Op.281
Piano Trio No.4, Op.289
The Art of Preluding, Op.300
Anton Diabelli – Grande Sonate brillante pour le Pianoforte et Guitare, Op.102
Fanny Mendelssohn Hensel 
Gegenwart. Allegro Moderato H-U 270
In Die Ferne. Allegretto Affettuoso H-U 271
Ferdinand Hiller – Neuer Frühling, Op.16
Johann Nepomuk Hummel – Fantasy for piano
Georg Kopprasch – 60 Etudes for High-Horn, Op.5
Franz Liszt – Malédiction, S.121
Joseph Mayseder – String Quintet No. 2 in A minor, Op.51
Felix Mendelssohn – Symphony No. 4 "Italian"
Joseph Merk – 20 Exercises for Cello, Op.11
Sigismond Neukomm – "Fantaisie dramatique on some pages of Milton’s Paradise lost"
Józef Nowakowski – Piano Quintet, Op. 17
George Onslow 
String Quartet No.22, Op.47
Symphony No. 3 in F minor
Carl Gottlieb Reissiger – Piano Trio No.7, Op.85
Clara Schumann – Romance variée, Op.3
Robert Schumann – 6 Concert Etudes after Paganini Caprices, Op.10
Louis Spohr – String Quintet No.4, Op.91
Johann Strauss Sr 
Fra Diavolo, Op.41
Die vier Temperamente, Op.59
Carnevals-Spende, Op.60
Tausendsapperment Walzer, Op.61
Sigismond Thalberg – Fantaisie sur des motifs de l'opéra 'La straniera', Op.9

Opera
Daniel François Esprit Auber – Gustave III, premiered February 27 in Paris
Vincenzo Bellini – Beatrice di Tenda, premiered March 16 in Venice
Hector Berlioz – Les francs-juges, H 23, last revision
Gaetano Donizetti – Lucrezia Borgia, premiered December 26 in Milan
Heinrich Marschner – Hans Heiling

Births
January 17 – Theodor Bradsky, composer (died 1881)
January 26 – Grenville Dean Wilson, composer (died 1897)
February 12 – Charles-Wilfrid Bériot, pianist (died 1914)
February 13 – James William Elliott, nursery rhyme composer (died 1915)
March 7 – Franz Wohlfahrt, violin teacher and composer (d. 1884)
March 13 – Nikolay Zverev, pianist (died 1893)
March 17 – Giuseppe Gariboldi, flautist and composer (d. 1905)
March 23 – Franz Bendel, pianist (died 1874)
April 30 – Hortense Schneider, operatic soprano (d. 1920)
May 1 – Theodor Krause, composer (died 1910)
May 5 – Jean Becker, violinist (d. 1884)
May 7 – Johannes Brahms, composer (d. 1897)
May 9
Beniamino Carelli, singing teacher (d. 1921)
Bolesław Dembiński, organist and composer (d. 1914)
May 11 – Jean Becker, violinist (died 1884)
May 26 – Merian Genast, vocalist (died 1905)
June 7 – Alexander Ritter, composer and violinist (d. 1896)
June 8 – Alexander Julius Paul Dorn, composer (died 1901)
June 20 – Anton Door, pianist (died 1919)
June 27 – , composer and pianist (b. 1902)
July 26 – Otto Singer, composer (d. 1894)
September 14 – Francis Edward Bache, organist (died 1858)
September 19 – Ludwig von Brenner, conductor (died 1902)
September 26 – Gustav Stolpe, conductor and composer (d. 1902)
October 14 – William George Cusins, composer (died 1893)
October 26 – Adelaide Phillips, operatic contralto (d. 1882)
November 6 – Wilhelm Ganz, composer (died 1914)
November 12 – Alexander Borodin, composer (d. 1887)
date unknown
Luigi Bassi, clarinet player and composer (d. 1871)
Mathilda Enequist, opera singer (d. 1898)

Deaths
January 16 - Nannette Streicher, German piano maker, composer, music educator and writer (b 1769)
January 19 – Ferdinand Hérold, composer (b. 1791)
January 20 – Gertrud Elisabeth Mara, operatic soprano (b. 1749)
March 3 – Heinrich Werner, composer (b. 1800)
April 7 – Antoni Radziwiłł, Polish aristocrat and musician (b. 1775)
April 13 – Elisa von der Recke, lyricist (born 1754)
May 25 – Johann Andreas Streicher, pianist, composer and piano maker (b. 1761)
May 28 – Johann Christian Friedrich Hæffner, composer (b. 1759)
May 29 – William Marshall, fiddler and composer (b. 1748)
July 24 – Hedda Wrangel, Swedish aristocrat and musician (b. 1792)
September 14 – John Andrew Stevenson, composer (b. c.1761)
October 1 – Luísa Todi, operatic soprano (b. 1753)
October 15 – Michał Kleofas Ogiński, composer and Polish diplomat (born 1765)
November 8 – Maximilian Stadler, pianist and composer (b. 1748)

References

 
19th century in music
Music by year